Hebestatis is a genus of mygalomorph spiders in the family Halonoproctidae, first described by Eugène Simon in 1903.  it contains only 1 species: H. theveneti.

References

Halonoproctidae
Mygalomorphae genera
Taxa named by Eugène Simon